is a town in Kamiukena District, Ehime Prefecture, Japan. , the town had an estimated population of 6,922 and a population density of 12 persons per km².

Geography 
Kumakōgen  is located in south-central Ehime Prefecture, on the north side of the Shikoku Mountains, along upper reaches of the Niyodo River. It consists of many hamlets are scattered along river valleys mostly covered with forests. Mount Ishizuchi, the tallest mountain in Shikoku at 1982 meters is located on the border between Seiyo to the northeast. The climate is cool and wet in the summer and winters cold with snow.

Neighbouring municipalities 
Ehime Prefecture
Matsuyama
Seiyo
Tōon
Saijō
Tobe
Uchiko
Kōchi Prefecture
Ino
Niyodogawa
Tsuno
Yusuhara

Climate
Kumakōgen has a Humid subtropical climate (Köppen Cfa) characterized by warm summers and cool winters with light snowfall.  The average annual temperature in Kumakōgen is 13.2 °C. The average annual rainfall is 2014 mm with September as the wettest month. The temperatures are highest on average in January, at around 24.4 °C, and lowest in January, at around 1.9 °C.

Demographics
Per Japanese census data, the population of Kumakōgen has been decreased drastically since the 1950s and is now only third of what it was a century ago.

History 
The area of Kumakōgen was part of ancient Iyo Province. During the Edo period, the area was divided between the holdings of Matsuyama Domain or Ōzu Domain. The village of Kumachō was established with the creation of the modern municipalities system on December 1, 1889. It was raised to town status on August 20, 1901 and renamed Kuma. On August 1, 2004 Kuma merged with the villages of Mikawa, Omogo and Yanadani, all from Kamiukena District to form the town of Kumakōgen.

Government
Kumakōgen has a mayor-council form of government with a directly elected mayor and a unicameral town council of 13 members. Kumakōgen is lumped together with the city of Matsuyama, with the combined area contributing 16 members to the Ehime Prefectural Assembly. In terms of national politics, the town is part of Ehime 4th district of the lower house of the Diet of Japan.

Economy
The key industry of Kumakōgen is agriculture and forestry. The town was known for its high-quality wood such as Cryptomeria and hinoki cypress grown in harsh natural conditions, and highland vegetables such as tomatoes, green peppers, and rice that take advantage of the cool summer weather. However, due to the influx of foreign lumber and the slump in lumber prices, the forestry industry has been in decline.

Education
Kumakōgen has nine public elementary schools and two public middle schools operated by the town government, and one public high school operated by the Ehime Prefectural Board of Education.

Transportation

Railway
Kumakōgen has no passenger railway services. The nearest station to the town is Iyo-Tachibana Station on the Iyotetsu Yokogawara Line

Highways

Local attractions
Taihō-ji, temple 44in the Shikoku Pilgrimage
Iwaya-ji, temple 45 in the Shikoku Pilgrimage
Goraikō Falls, one of the "One Hundred Waterfalls of Japan"
Kamikuroiwaiwakage Site, Jomon period remains, National Historic Site

Noted people from Kumakōgen
Hiroshi Fujioka, actor, martial artist

References

External links

  

Towns in Ehime Prefecture
Kumakōgen, Ehime